The 2015 Iowa State Cyclones football team represented Iowa State University in the 2015 NCAA Division I FBS football season. Playing as a member of the Big 12 Conference (Big 12), the team played its home games at Jack Trice Stadium in Ames, Iowa. They were led by seventh-year head coach Paul Rhoads. They finished the season 3–9, 2–7 in Big 12 play to finish in ninth place.

On October 26, 2015, Mark Mangino was replaced as offensive coordinator with Todd Sturdy, formerly the passing game coordinator, on an interim basis.  On November 23, Rhoads was fired. He stayed on to coach the final game of the season on November 28. He finished at Iowa State with a seven-year record of 32–55.

Previous season
The 2014 Iowa State Cyclones football team finished the regular season 2–10, with wins over only non conference play, Iowa and Toledo. The Cyclones became ineligible for a bowl game after losing its seventh game against Kansas on November 8.

Schedule

Schedule Source:

Personnel

Game summaries

Game 1: vs. Northern Iowa Panthers

Game 2: vs. Iowa Hawkeyes

Game 3: at Toledo Rockets

Game 4: vs. Kansas Jayhawks

Game 5: at Texas Tech Red Raiders

Game 6: vs. TCU Horned Frogs

Game 7: at Baylor Bears

Game 8: vs. Texas Longhorns

Game 9: at Oklahoma Sooners

Game 10: vs. Oklahoma State Cowboys

Game 11: at Kansas State Wildcats

Game 12: at West Virginia Mountaineers

Awards

National Team of the Week
Following the 24–0 shutout of Texas on the weekend of October 31, the 2015 Iowa State football team received the AutoNation National Team of the Week by the FWAA.

This was its third shutout over a Big 12 opponent in school history, the previous against Kansas 34–0 on November 23, 2013. The Cyclones gained 426 yards in total offensive while the defense allowed only 204 yards, which is the third-lowest total an ISU defense has allowed vs. a Big 12 opponent in school history.  Also, this was the fewest yards allowed vs. a FBS team in the Paul Rhoads era.  The dominating ISU defense held Texas to nine plays in ISU territory with seven of these on Texas's final drive.

This was Texas’s first shutout loss against an unranked team since November 18, 1961, when TCU shutout #1 ranked Texas 6–0.

For Iowa State, Mike Warren, the nation’s best freshman rusher, picked up 157 yards on the ground on 32 carries and added the first ISU touchdown, the fourth-best rookie rushing effort in school history. Joel Lanning got his first career start at quarterback, rushing for 64 yards and completing 19 of 37 passes for 188 yards with a touchdown pass to Dondre Daley and no interceptions.  Freshman Joshua Thomas punched in the third ISU touchdown, his sixth of the season, tying a Cyclone freshman record set by Alexander Robinson in 2007.

This was the Cyclones first home win over the Longhorns in six tries

Walter Camp National Defensive Player of the Week
Jordan Harris was honored as the Walter Camp National Defensive Player of the Week for games ending October 31, 2015.  Harris's seven tackles and one interception led the Cyclones crushing shutout of Texas 24–0.  Jordan is the third Cyclone to receive National Player of the Week honors: WR Todd Blythe on October 30, 2005, and LB Jesse Smith on October 25, 2009.

References

Iowa State
Iowa State Cyclones football seasons
Iowa State Cyclones football